Prasophyllum hians, commonly known as the yawning leek orchid, is a species of orchid endemic to the south-west of Western Australia. It is a common, tall leek orchid with a single smooth, tubular leaf and up to fifty or more pink and fawn flowers with a frilly labellum.

Description
As with others in the genus, the flowers are inverted so that the labellum is above the column rather than below it. The lateral sepals are joined to each other and the petals face forwards. The labellum is white, turns upwards through about 90° and has a frilly edge. Flowering occurs from September to November.

Taxonomy and naming
Prasophyllum hians was first formally described in 1871 by Heinrich Gustav Reichenbach and the description was published in Beitrage zur Systematischen Pflanzenkunde.<ref name=APNI>{{cite web|title=Prasophyllum hians''''|url= https://id.biodiversity.org.au/instance/apni/534313|publisher=APNI|accessdate=21 November 2017}}</ref> The specific epithet (hians) is a Latin word meaning "open" or "gaping", referring to the open appearance of the flower.

Distribution and habitat
The yawning leek orchid  grows in a range of habitats from wet areas to forest between Dongara and Israelite Bay in the Avon Wheatbelt, Esperance Plains, Jarrah Forest, Swan Coastal Plain and Warren biogeographic regions.<ref name=FloraBase>{{FloraBase|name=Prasophyllum hians''|id=1676}}</ref>

ConservationPrasophyllum hians'' is classified as "not threatened" by the Western Australian Government Department of Parks and Wildlife.

References

External links 
 
 

hians
Endemic flora of Western Australia
Endemic orchids of Australia
Plants described in 1871